Dolichocolpodes mirabilis is a species of beetle in the family Carabidae, the only species in the genus Dolichocolpodes.

References

Platyninae